HMS E16 was an E-class submarine built by Vickers, Barrow-in-Furness for the Royal Navy. She was laid down on 15 May 1913 and was commissioned on 27 February 1915. Her hull cost £105,700. E16 was sunk by a mine in Heligoland Bight on 22 August 1916. There were no survivors.

Design
She was powered by two  Vickers eight-cylinder two-stroke diesel engines and two  electric motors.

As with most of the early E class boats, E16 was not fitted with a deck gun during construction but may have had one fitted later, forward of the conning tower. She had five 18 inch (450 mm) torpedo tubes, two in the bow, one either side amidships, and one in the stern; a total of 10 torpedoes were carried.

E-Class submarines had wireless systems with  power ratings; in some submarines, these were later upgraded to  systems by removing a midship torpedo tube. Their maximum design depth was  although in service some reached depths of below . Some submarines contained Fessenden oscillator systems.

Crew
Her complement was three officers and 28 men.

References

External links
 Casualties
 'Submarine losses 1904 to present day' - Royal Navy Submarine Museum 

 

British E-class submarines of the Royal Navy
Ships built in Barrow-in-Furness
1914 ships
World War I submarines of the United Kingdom
World War I shipwrecks in the North Sea
Royal Navy ship names
Maritime incidents in 1916
Ships sunk by mines
Lost submarines of the United Kingdom